John Luke Mau is a German weightlifter. He represented Germany at the 2019 World Weightlifting Championships, and in 2018, as well as the 2019 and 2021 European Championships.

At the 2021 European Junior & U23 Weightlifting Championships in Rovaniemi, Finland, he won the gold medal in his event.

References 

Living people
1998 births
German male weightlifters